Thomas Berge, pseudonym of Chiel Thomas Ottink (born 25 January 1990) is a Dutch singer.

Biography
Thomas Berge was born in Enschede.  He released his first single at the age of twelve. The album, Mijn Luchtballon, sold 800,000 promotional copies and was distributed by Neckermann. His stage name was chosen with the German music market in mind. In 2005 he was awarded the Zilveren Harp, the most prestigious award for promising new talent given in The Netherlands.

In the same month, he was seen on television station TEN in the musical program 'Just the Two of Us'. The regional television station  began a program on 2 June 2007 called "Toppers on Horses". It taught riding to Dutch celebrities. In October 2007 he recorded the single "De Stem van Mijn Hart" with Junior Contest Participant Tess Gaerthé. This is the Dutch version of the song "You are the Music in Me" from High School Musical 2.

He has made a number of television appearances throughout his career. Most notably, he stars in his own reality show, broadcast since 11 January 2008, on Dutch television station Nederland 1.

In 2008 he released his first single to enter the Dutch top 10, Zonder jou. This was followed shortly afterwards by Ieder moment which peaked at number 4 in the Dutch Single Top 100 chart and Kon ik maar even bij je zijn which was Berge' first number one single in The Netherlands.

Together with  he took part in the second Eurovision Dance Contest 2008 in Glasgow. They ended last with ONE point.

In 2009 he participated in the Dutch television program 'The Best Singers of the Netherlands' together with several other well-known Dutch singers. They took turns in singing each other's repertoire. During a vacation in Salou, Spain in the same year he became infected with the "Mexican Flu".

, he is scheduled to appear in the photography game show Het perfecte plaatje.

Personal life 
Thomas Berge lives in Losser, province Overijssel. In 2010 it was announced in RTL Boulevard that Thomas Berge had checked in at a rehabilitation clinic. He has now addressed this issue. He began a relationship in 2012 with the five years older actress Myrthe Mylius known from the Dutch series 'Nederlandse Hollywood Vrouwen'. In June 2013 they welcomed their first child. The relationship with Mylius ended in July 2016.

His brother Rens is the drummer for English band Temples.

Trivia

 On his left lower arm, Berge has a tattoo of his son's name, born 6 June 2013.
 In December 2011 in Gouda, Berge played the part of the apostle Peter in The Passion.
 In 2013 he broke with his discoverer and manager Johnny Sap after 12 year together.
 In January 2015  he wrote a song called ‘Wie zijn wij’  for the terrorist attacks in Paris.
 In 2015, a load of Thomas Berge's DVDs was found on the A27 highway in Netherlands. All were broken and the incident resulted in a big traffic jam. 
 On 15 May 2016 vandals ravaged the front garden of his house in Alphen aan den Rhijn
 In August 2016 in Amersfoort, Berge lost control over his Mercedes Benz and crashed into a tree. Neither of the two occupants was seriously injured. The car was total loss.

Discography

Albums 

|-
|align="left"|Thomas Berge||2003||25-10-2003||41||5||
|-
|align="left"|Als jij lacht||2004||26-02-2005||20||22||
|-
|align="left"|De mooiste||2005||29-10-2005||37||4|| Compilation Album
|-
|align="left"|Kerst met Thomas Berge||2005||-||||||
|-
|align="left"|Geloof in je dromen||2006||18-11-2006||32||8||
|-
|align="left"|Compleet||2007||15-03-2008||41||4||
|-
|align="left"|Live in de HMH||2008||04-10-2008||46||4|| Live Album
|-
|align="left"|Kon ik maar even bij je zijn||30-10-2009||07-11-2009||10||8||
|-
|align="left"|1221||02-09-2011||10-09-2011||8||6||
|-
|align="left"|Berge verzet||2014||01-03-2014||9||4*||
|}

Singles 

|-
|align="left"|Mijn luchtballon||2003||-|||||| Nr. 24 in the Single Top 100
|-
|align="left"|Als jij er morgen niet meer bent||2003||-|||||| Nr. 34 in the Single Top 100
|-
|align="left"|Een glimlach||2004||-|||||| Nr. 36 in the Single Top 100
|-
|align="left"|Als jij lacht||2005||-|||||| Nr. 46 in the Single Top 100
|-
|align="left"|Ik zie mijn leven als een melodie||2005||-|||||| Nr. 26 in the Single Top 100
|-
|align="left"|De mooiste||2005||-|||||| Nr. 45 in the Single Top 100
|-
|align="left"|Als een mooie droom||2005||-|||||| Nr. 54 in the Single Top 100
|-
|align="left"|Jantjes gitaar||2005||-|||||| with Johnny Hoes /Nr. 68 in the Single Top 100
|-
|align="left"|Val aan||2006||-|||||| Nr. 68 in the Single Top 100
|-
|align="left"|Bellen||2006||-|||||| Nr. 68 in the Single Top 100
|-
|align="left"|Jij bent mijn leven||2006||-|||||| Nr. 68 in the Single Top 100
|-
|align="left"|Heel even||2007||-|||||| Nr. 71 in the Single Top 100
|-
|align="left"|De wereld ben jij||2007||14-07-2007||tip5||-|| Nr. 35 in the Single Top 100 /Soundtrack Zoop in Zuid-Amerika
|-
|align="left"|De stem van mijn hart||2007||06-10-2007||tip2||-|| with Tess /Nr. 45 in the Single Top 100 / Soundtrack High School Musical 2
|-
|align="left"|Niet meer en niet minder||2008||-|||||| Nr. 48 in the Single Top 100
|-
|align="left"|Zonder jou||2008||12-07-2008||tip6||-|| Nr. 10 in the Single Top 100
|-
|align="left"|Ieder moment||2009||25-07-2009||tip9||-|| Nr. 4 in the Single Top 100
|-
|align="left"|Kon ik maar even bij je zijn||09-10-2009||-|||||| Nr. 1 in the Single Top 100 / Gold
|-
|align="left"|Geen kerstfeest zonder jou||12-2009||-|||||| Nr. 1 in the Single Top 100
|-
|align="left"|Ik vertrouw je niet meer||02-2010||-|||||| Nr. 7 in the Single Top 100
|-
|align="left"|Niets te veel||14-11-2010||-|||||| Nr. 14 in the Single Top 100
|-
|align="left"|Mijn woord||30-04-2011||-|||||| Nr. 8 in the Single Top 100
|-
|align="left"|Niets is onmogelijk||2011||-|||||| Nr. 8 in the Single Top 100
|-
|align="left"|Alleen omhoog||2013||23-11-2013||tip3||-|| Nr. 12 in the Single Top 100
|-
|align="left"|Kerstmis vier je samen''||2014||13-12-2014||tip25||-|| as part of 'Eenmaal Voor Allen' /Nr. 68 in the Single Top 100
|}

DVDs

References

External links 

 

1990 births
Living people
21st-century Dutch male singers
21st-century Dutch singers
Musicians from Overijssel
People from Enschede
People from Haaksbergen